The men's 4 x 10 kilometre relay was held on 2 March 2007 at 14:30 CET at Shirahatayama cross-country course in Sapporo. The defending world champions were the Norwegian team of Odd-Bjørn Hjelmeset, Frode Estil, Lars Berger and Tore Ruud Hofstad.

Results

References

External links
Final Results - International Ski Federation (FIS)

FIS Nordic World Ski Championships 2007